Abhilasha may refer to:

TV and film 
 Abhilasha (TV series), Indian Telugu-language soap opera, on air 2019–2020
 Abhilasha (1968 film), Indian Hindi-language romance
 Abhilasha (1983 film), Indian Telugu-language thriller

People 
 Abhilasha (actress), actress in Hindi and Malayalam-language films such as Kanana Sundari
 Abhilasha Gupta, Indian politician
 Abhilasha Kumari (born 1956), Indian jurist
 Abhilasha Mhatre (born 1987), Indian kabaddi player
 Abhilash Thapliyal, Indian presenter and actor